Bianca Miquela Landrau (born August 16, 1990), known professionally as Bia, is an American rapper who debuted on the Oxygen reality television show Sisterhood of Hip Hop. She signed to Pharrell's I Am Other record label, in partnership with RCA Records in 2014. Her first EP, Nice Girls Finish Last: Cuidado, was released in 2018. She is best recognized for featuring on the 2016 single "Safari" by J Balvin and "Best on Earth" by Russ in 2019. In early 2020, Bia signed a new record deal with Epic Records, releasing her second EP, For Certain, on December 11, 2020. The EP spawned the single "Whole Lotta Money", which later was released as a remix featuring Nicki Minaj and reached the top 20 of the Billboard Hot 100.

Early life 
Bia is originally from Medford, Massachusetts. She is of Puerto Rican and Italian descent. In an interview with Oxygen's website, she spoke about wanting to become a rapper at a young age after attending studio sessions with rappers and helping them record. Bia attended college briefly, but after realizing it did not suit her, she dropped out and began bartending to pay for studio time. She moved to Los Angeles full time in 2017.

Career

2014–2015: Career beginnings and #CholaSeason 
Bia was initially discovered by rapper Fam-Lay through YouTube and who later introduced her to Pharrell. Bia starred on the first two seasons of the Oxygen reality television show Sisterhood of Hip Hop. In 2014, she signed to the I Am Other music label as part of a collaboration with RCA Records and began working with T.I as well as singers Jennifer Hudson and Usher. Later that year, Bia released a mixtape entitled #CholaSeason. In an interview with radio station Hot 97's morning show Ebro in the Morning in September 2015, she revealed that she would not return for season 3 of Sisterhood of Hip Hop.

2016–2018: Touring and Nice Girls Finish Last: Cuidado 
Bia served as the opening act for Pusha T's Darkest Before the Dawn Tour in March and April 2016. The next month, Bia alongside Victoria Monét, were the main support acts for the European leg of Ariana Grande's Dangerous Woman Tour. Bia also opened for select dates during the North American leg. Bia was featured on J Balvin's song "Safari", released as a single in May 2016. The track topped the charts in Mexico and Spain as well as peaking at No. 3 on the US Latin Charts.

In 2016, Bia released the singles "Whip It" and "Gucci Comin' Home". These singles were followed by "Badside" and "Fungshway", which were both released in 2017. All four singles were intended to be included on Bia's then-upcoming debut EP titled Trap Vogue, to be followed by her debut album. Bia described the project as "high energy with Latin elements mixed in". She also revealed that the song "Esta Noche" featuring Grande, which was performed during Bia's opening set for the Dangerous Woman Tour, would be included on the project. Bia eventually scrapped the project in favor of new material.

Bia was featured on the track "Miami", from Kali Uchis' debut album Isolation, which was released on April 6, 2018. Victoria Monét released a remix of her song "Freak", featuring Bia on July 10, 2018. A visual was released including a shortened version of the track just containing Bia's verse and a chorus, while the full version of the song appeared on streaming platforms. On September 21, 2018, Bia released her debut EP Nice Girls Finish Last: Cuidado, which included the single "Hollywood", as well as collaborations with Uchis and Kodak Black.

2019–present: Departure from RCA and For Certain 
In 2019, Bia split from RCA Records, citing the label was preventing her from releasing music. She released her first independent song "One Minute Warning" in August. "Best on Earth", a collaboration with rapper and singer Russ, was released on October 17, 2019. Singer Rihanna posted on her social media that it was her new favorite song, which led to an internet trend #BestOnEarthChallenge and a spike in popularity to the song. The song eventually peaked at number 46 on the Billboard Hot 100, becoming Bia's first entry on the chart and was certified Platinum by the RIAA for selling over one million units in the United States. On September 29, the song garnered Bia her first BET Hip Hop Awards nomination for Sweet 16: Best Featured Verse.

In early 2020, Bia resigned with Sony under Epic Records and released two singles, "Free BIA (1st Day Out)" and "Cover Girl". "Cover Girl" was serviced to Urban and Rhythmic radios on April 14. In September 2020, Bia released the single "Same Hands" featuring American rapper Lil Durk. Another single, "Skate", was released in November 2020, alongside a music video. A reworked version of the song, entitled the "NHL Mix", was later used as the theme song for the 2021 Stanley Cup playoffs. All songs are included on Bia's second EP, titled For Certain, which was released on December 11, 2020, through Epic Records. A music video for the song "Whole Lotta Money" was released on April 8, 2021. Following viral success on the social media platform TikTok, the song was serviced to Rhythmic radio on May 18, 2021, becoming the fifth single from the EP. A remix featuring Nicki Minaj was released on July 9, 2021, and caused the song to reach a peak of number 16 on the Billboard Hot 100, becoming Bia's highest-charting song. On September 24, she released the single "Besito" featuring G Herbo. Alongside the release, Bia announced the deluxe edition of For Certain which will be released on October 22, 2021.

In an interview with Ladygunn, Bia revealed she is working on an R&B project titled R&BIA.

On February 5, 2022, Bia launched her own make-up line Beauty for Certain. On April 8, 2022, Bia released a song with rapper J Cole entitled "London". On September 9, 2022, Bia featured on the remix to Nicki Minaj's song "Super Freaky Girl" entitled the "Queen Mix" alongside JT from City Girls, Katie Got Bandz, Akbar V, and Maliibu Miitch.
In September 2022 Bia also featured on german rapper Luciano track „Bamba“.

Artistry 
Bia has cited American rapper Jay-Z, Puerto Rican rapper Ivy Queen, American singer Selena, and fellow rappers Bankroll Fresh, 21 Savage, Nicki Minaj, Foxy Brown, M.I.A., and Blac Youngsta as her biggest influences, as well as Aaliyah and Rihanna as her personal muses. Bia stated that she has never connected with an artist the way she has connected with Rihanna.

Filmography

Television

Awards and nominations

Tours

Supporting 
 Pusha T – Darkest Before the Dawn Tour (2016)
 Ariana Grande – Dangerous Woman Tour (2017)
 Don Toliver – Life of a Don Tour (2021)

Discography

EPs

Mixtapes

Singles

As lead artist

As featured artist

Promotional singles

Guest appearances 

Notes

References

External links 
 
 

1990 births
21st-century American women singers
21st-century American singers
East Coast hip hop musicians
Hispanic and Latino American musicians
Living people
Rappers from Boston
21st-century American rappers
American musicians of Puerto Rican descent
American people of Italian descent
Puerto Rican women rappers
Hispanic and Latino American rappers
People from Medford, Massachusetts
21st-century women rappers